Steve Eise is a retired American soccer player who played professionally in the American Professional Soccer League.

Eise, brother of David Eise, graduated from Rosary High School in St. Louis, Missouri.  He attended St. Louis University, playing on the men's soccer team from 1985 to 1988.  On July 9, 1989, the St. Louis Storm selected Eise in the second round of the Major Indoor Soccer League Amateur Draft.  He never played a first team game with the Storm.  He also played indoors with the Detroit Rockers during the 1990–91 National Professional Soccer League season.  In 1990, Eise joined the Colorado Foxes of the American Professional Soccer League.  He was a 1990 Second Team All Western Conference and a 1991 All League Honorable Mention defender.

References

Living people
Soccer players from St. Louis
American soccer players
American Professional Soccer League players
Colorado Foxes players
Detroit Rockers players
Major Indoor Soccer League (1978–1992) players
National Professional Soccer League (1984–2001) players
Saint Louis Billikens men's soccer players
St. Louis Storm players
Association football defenders
Year of birth missing (living people)